Ilex hualgayoca is a species of tree in the family Aquifoliaceae.

References

Trees of Peru
Trees of Ecuador
hualgayoca